Novy Akbulyak (Yañı Aqbüläk) is a rural locality (a village) in Staroakbulyakovsky Selsoviet, Karaidelsky District, Bashkortostan, Russia. The population was 278 as of 2010. There are 4 streets.

Geography 
Novy Akbulyak is located 19 km northwest of Karaidel (the district's administrative centre) by road. Khalilovo is the nearest rural locality.

References 

Rural localities in Karaidelsky District